Highway 49 (MT 49) in the U.S. State of Montana is a route running in a northerly direction from a junction with U.S. Route 2 in the town of East Glacier Park. Highway 49 is near the southeastern corner of Glacier National Park, and is heavily used by tourists during the summer months. A spur road heading west from Montana 49 four miles (6 km) north of East Glacier provides access to the Two Medicine area of the park.

Much of the route is steep, narrow, and winding, and prone to landslides.  The northerly  of the route, passing over Looking Glass Hill, is unmaintained and usually impassable during the winter months.

Highway 49 was once part of the alignment of U.S. 2, prior to the construction of a highway bridge across Two Medicine Creek, which allowed for a more direct route between East Glacier and Browning.

Major intersections

Images

References

055
Transportation in Glacier County, Montana
U.S. Route 2